Passe-passe is a 2008 French film directed and written by Tonie Marshall.

Cast
 Nathalie Baye – Irène Montier-Duval
 Edouard Baer – Darry Marzouki
 Guy Marchand – Pierre Delage
 Mélanie Bernier – Sonia Yacovlev
 Joey Starr – Max
 Maurice Bénichou – Serge
 Bulle Ogier – Madeleine
 Sandrine Le Berre – Carine
 Michel Vuillermoz – Sacha Lombard
 Hippolyte Girardot – The man with the white shirt
 Samir Guesmi – The nurse
 Michaël Abiteboul – Redhair

References

External links
 
 

2008 films
French road movies
2000s road movies
Films directed by Tonie Marshall
2000s French films